Preachers' Daughters is an American docusoap series that premiered on March 12, 2013, and airs on Lifetime. The second season premiered on March 5, 2014, with two families joining the cast.
The third season was announced to be returning on January 23, 2015, with two new families. The Colemans, the Elliots, and the Koloffs were not returning to the third season with it turning into a reality TV show with 9 girls who are living in the house and trying to stay saved and without leaving.

Premise
Preachers' Daughters encompasses four to five pastors' daughters and their families as they are put through the test of balancing their lives with their parents' firm expectations, all the while following their religious values.

Cast

Current

 Megan Cassidy (Hometown: Inman, South Carolina, age: 18) - the only returning member of season-two's cast
 Tyche Crockett (Hometown: New Orleans, Louisiana, age: 22)
 Nikki Efimetz (Hometown: Columbia, South Carolina, age: 19)
 Kristiana Flowers (Hometown: Detroit, Michigan, age: 18)
 Jayde Gomez (Hometown: Lakeland, Florida), age: 20)
 Kori Haynes (Hometown: McComb, Mississippi, age: 22)
 Cierra Vaughn (Hometown: Country Club Hills, Illinois, age: 23)
 Kayla Wilde (Hometown: Newport Beach, California, age: 20)
 Lolly White (Hometown: Inglewood, California, age: 24)

Former

 The Perrys (location: Oceano, California) - Olivia is 18 years old and has her own child. After living a life of using drugs and underage drinking, Olivia was able to turn her life around in time for her daughter's birth. Her stronger religious connection and family has helped her along the way. Olivia's father, Mark, is the pastor of Everyday Church, where her mother, Cheryl, both works at the church part-time and stays at home helping the family. Olivia has two older sisters: Emily (age 20) and Audrey (age 23).
 The Colemans (location: Joliet, Illinois) - Taylor is 18 years old. Her mother, Marie, attempts to keep a peaceful household despite Taylor wanting to break all the rules. Ken, Taylor's father, is a pastor of the City of Refuge Pentecostal Church. Taylor vents about life to her older sister Kendra, who was kicked out at the age of 20 because she became pregnant.
 The Koloffs (location: Kannapolis, North Carolina and Spring Hill, Tennessee) - Kolby is 16 years old. Her parents are divorced, so her time is divided between two homes. Her father, Nikita, is a former professional wrestler, but is now a traveling evangelist. Her mother and ex-wife of Nikita, Victoria, is a Christian preacher who also hosts a radio show and is a director of two pregnancy centers. Kolby is the youngest in the family, with three older sisters: Kendra, Tawni, and Teryn. In the first few episodes of season one, Kolby had a boyfriend named Micah.

 The Elliotts (location:New Orleans, Louisiana) - Tori is a former cop, and her parents are Kenny and Monique. After she was served with an eviction notice, Tori is forced to move back home with her parents and sister, Courtney.
 The Cassidys  (location: Boiling Springs, South Carolina) - Megan's father, Jeff, joined the ministry full-time and discovered that everything she does or says is seen by the entire church. Her mother, Darleen, is the associate pastor's wife, while Megan's brother, Zac, is in rehabilitation.

Episodes

Season 1 (2013)

Season 2 (2014)

Season 3 (2015)

References

External links
 

2010s American reality television series
2013 American television series debuts
2015 American television series endings
English-language television shows
Lifetime (TV network) original programming
Television series about teenagers